Rogerio dos Reis (born 17 March 1992) is a Brazilian male  BMX rider, representing his nation at international competitions. He was Brazilian champion in 2013. He competed in the time trial event at the 2015 UCI BMX World Championships.

 Brazilian champion in 2013
 2º Place Pan Americano 2014 - Quito/Ecuador

References

External links
 
 

1992 births
Living people
BMX riders
Brazilian male cyclists
Brazilian BMX riders
Place of birth missing (living people)
21st-century Brazilian people
20th-century Brazilian people